Bonifaz, a variation of the name Bonifatius, may refer to:
 John Bonifaz (born 1966), Boston-based attorney and political activist
 Rubén Bonifaz Nuño (born 1923), Mexican poet and classical scholar
 Ramón de Bonifaz (1196-1252 or 1256), medieval Spanish naval leader
 Santiago Alba y Bonifaz (1872–1949), Spanish politician, lawyer, and politician

Spanish-language surnames